Numb is the eponymously-titled debut studio album of Numb, released in 1987 by Edge and World Records.

Reception

John Bush of AllMusic says "with its periodic stabs of metallic guitars, Numb's 1987 self-titled debut album is strongly reminiscent of two other bands who share their hometown, Front Line Assembly and Skinny Puppy."

Track listing

Personnel
Adapted from the Numb liner notes.

Numb
 Don Gordon – instruments, production, arrangements
 David Hall (as Daivd Hall) – instruments, production, arrangements
 Sean Stubbs (Sean St. Hubbs) – instruments, production, arrangements

Production and design
 Ric Arboit – engineering
 Tom Ferris – engineering
 Dave Ogilvie – engineering
 Gord Martin – photography
 John Robert Mingo – photography
 Cal Stephenson – engineering
 Greg Sykes – design, typesetting
 Anthony Valcic – engineering, photography, production and arrangements (A1, A2, B2)

Release history

References

External links 
 Numb at Bandcamp
 

1987 debut albums
Numb (band) albums
Metropolis Records albums